The Real World: New Orleans is the ninth season of MTV's reality television series The Real World, which focuses on a group of diverse strangers living together for several months in a different city each season, as cameras follow their lives and interpersonal relationships. It is the first season of The Real World to be filmed in West South Central States region of the United States, specifically in Louisiana.

The season featured seven people who lived in a remodeled Civil War-era mansion, called The Belfort, in the Garden District, New Orleans and is the first of two seasons to be filmed in New Orleans. Ten years later, the show made a return in the twenty-fourth season.

Filming took place over the course of 124 days between January and late May 2000 in the Belfort Mansion on St. Charles Avenue.  The season premiered June 13 of that year and consisted of 23 episodes.

Author Anne Rice has a guest appearance this season.

The residence
The mansion was originally built for Alexander C. Hutchinson, who lived there with his wife until his death in 1902. It was later divided into apartments, but was in the process of being returned to a single-family residence when producers discovered it. New Orleans-based art director Monroe Kelly and architect Lee Ledbetter restored the mansion's original plan, enabling it to serve as the season's production set. For filming, it was filled with $293,442 worth of art. After filming ended, it took nearly four and a half years to complete the process of returning it to a single residence. The property managed to survive Hurricane Katrina in 2005 without any serious damage.

Assignment
Almost every season of The Real World, beginning with its fifth season, has included the assignment of a season-long group job or task to the housemates. The New Orleans cast was assigned to work at a New Orleans Public-access television station, with a different cast member acting as the producer of the segment every week.

Cast

: Age at the time of filming.

Episodes

Season highlights
The New Orleans cast was the first (and to date the only) cast to be featured on the cover of TV Guide, appearing on the June 24, 2000 edition.
Discussions on race are a staple on The Real World. On a boat trip in Louisiana, the boat guide referred to a type of stork the group spotted as a "nigger stork". Melissa took offense to the comment, and to the fact that Jamie was not as offended. After the show, it was revealed that the tour guide apologized to Melissa. In another discussion on race, Julie expressed that she was raised to cross the street if she saw a black person. After this, Melissa stated she was tired of talking about racism.
During the cast's group trip to South Africa, Melissa and Julie talked about racial issues, and were upset that David again sequestered himself from the group, preferring to spend time with their African tour guides.
In a crossover event with that season's Road Rules, (the sister series to The Real World), the Road Rules cast's mission was to steal the mansion's toy robot dog. The housemates, recalling that the Road Rules team from years back had stolen the eight ball from the Miami cast's pool table, hid their eight ball, not realizing that it was not the target.

After filming
After the cast left the Real World mansion, all seven of them appeared to discuss their experiences both during and since their time on the show, The Real World New Orleans Unmasked, which premiered on November 16, 2000, and was hosted by Nathan Blackburn from The Real World: Seattle and Rachel Campos from The Real World: San Francisco.

Though Stoffer and castmate Melissa Howard left the house as friends, their friendship later dissolved after disagreements regarding speaking engagements and monetary disputes,
  with Howard indicating during their time on the 2003 Real World/Road Rules Challenge: Battle of the Sexes that they were no longer friends.

At the 2008 The Real World Awards Bash, David was nominated in the "Biggest Playa" category, while Melissa was in the running for "Best Dance-Off".

After filming, Julie Stoffer was suspended from Brigham Young University for violating the school's honor code, which prohibits unmarried students from living in the same house with unrelated people of the opposite sex, including when school is not in session. Both Stoffer and her parents, themselves BYU alumni, criticized the manner in which the school suspended Stoffer, on the grounds that the letter with which BYU notified Stoffer of their decision, according to the Stoffers, implied that Stoffer had sexual relations with her male housemates, which Stoffer characterized as "totally false and slanderous." The school gave Stoffer six days to appeal their ruling, and included an outline of actions that Stoffer could take to regain admittance to the school, but as Stoffer was traveling while filming the MTV spinoff series, Real World/Road Rules Challenge, she did not file an appeal, and later stated that felt no respect for the school or its Honor Code, accusing the institution of assuming, on the basis of a "technical[ity]", that she was guilty of immoral conduct, when the footage shot during her time in the Real World mansion established otherwise. Stoffer was later a correspondent and host for the TV show The Electric Playground on the video game-themed cable TV network G4. She also spoke on behalf of Path-U-Find Media, promoting her moral values and working in abstinence and anti-tobacco campaigns. In 2004, Stoffer married ophthalmologist Spencer Rogers. Together they have three children. 

Melissa Howard created a blog during her time on the show called Princess Melissa, and as of 2008, continues to maintain it. She went on to become an actress and comedian who has worked on The Jamie Foxx Show, and starred in the Oxygen sketch comedy series Girls Behaving Badly. She also appeared in the 2005 Bravo show Battle of the Network Reality Stars. In 2007 she married Justin Beck, a guitarist for the group Glassjaw, with whom she bore two daughter, Shalom Mazie and Maja.<ref name="generation">{{cite web|title='REAL WORLDS NEXT GENERATION: SEE THE FORMER CAST MEMBERS' CAMERA-READY KIDS|url=http://www.mtv.com/news/2065104/real-world-castmembers-kids/|author=Jordana Ossad|website=MTV|date=February 2, 2015|access-date=May 13, 2019}}</ref> As of April 2022, she is a stay-at-home mother living in New York.

David Broom continued his musical work. Among his appearances was a 2003 performance on Chappelle's Show, appearing in the sixth episode of that's show's first season.Overview of Chappelle's Show. Episode #106. TV.com. Accessed September 30, 2010 Eventually he would go on to create a YouTube cooking series under the moniker Tokyo Niyeli. As of April 2022, he also writes manga.

Kelley Limp moved to Los Angeles, where she works in marketing for the television industry. In 2002, she began dating actor Scott Wolf, after meeting through a mutual friend in New York City. They married in May 2004, and live in Santa Monica, California. Their son, Jackson Kayse, was born on March 22, 2009.Lehner, Marla. "Scott Wolf and Wife Welcome a Son". People magazine. April 1, 2009 He was followed by Miller (born in 2012), and Lucy (born in 2014)."Kristen Bell on "Frozen": I Finally Have a Movie to Show Baby Lincoln!". tooFab.com. November 20, 2013.

Danny Roberts and former partner Wes Pereria have adopted a daughter, Naiya Sage. In 2018, he revealed that he had been disagnosed as HIV positive in 2011. He also revealed that his close friendship with former roommate Kelley Limp helped him through it. In 2018, Roberts revealed in an interview with Entertainment Weekly that he was HIV positive since 2011.

Matt Smith became a sports writer for the NBA's Phoenix Suns and webmaster of lifeteen.com. He has stated that he remained a virgin until he married his wife, Candyce on April 13, 2007. They live in Phoenix, Arizona, and had their first child, Norah, in September 2008. Their second child, Stella St. Clare, was born in October 2010. As of April 2022, they have six children.

In 2022, the cast reunited for The Real World Homecoming: New Orleans.

The Challenge
This is the second season of The Real World whose entire cast has at one time or another competed in MTV's spin-off reality series The Real World/Road Rules Challenge. The first is The Real World: Boston.

Bold indicates the contestant was a finalist on The Challenge.

References

External links

Episodes. The Real World: New Orleans. MTV.
Cast Bios. The Real World: New Orleans''. MTV.

New Orleans
Television shows set in New Orleans
2000 American television seasons
Television shows filmed in New Orleans